NGC 469 is a spiral galaxy in the constellation Pisces. Located approximately 167 million light-years from Earth, it was discovered by Albert Marth in 1864.

See also 
 List of galaxies
 List of spiral galaxies

References

External links 
 
 Deep Sky Catalog
 SEDS

469
Pisces (constellation)
Spiral galaxies
004753